Surin railway station is a railway station located in Nai Mueang Subdisrict, Surin City, Surin. The station opened in May 1926 as part of the Northeastern Line Buriram-Surin section. The line extended to Huai Thap Than in May 1927.

Train services 
 Special Express Diesel Car No. 21/22 Bangkok- Ubon Ratchathani - Bangkok
 Special Express "Isan Watthana" No. 23/24 Bangkok- Ubon Ratchathani - Bangkok
 Express No. 67/68 Bangkok- Ubon Ratchathani - Bangkok
 Express Diesel Car No. 71/72 Bangkok- Ubon Ratchathani - Bangkok
 Rapid No. 135/140 Bangkok - Ubon Ratchathani - Bangkok
 Rapid No. 139/146 Bangkok - Ubon Ratchathani - Bangkok
 Rapid No. 141/142 Bangkok - Ubon Ratchathani - Bangkok
 Rapid No. 145/136 Bangkok - Ubon Ratchathani - Bangkok
 Ordinary No. 233/234 Bangkok - Surin - Bangkok
 Local No. 419/420 Nakhon Ratchasima - Ubon Ratchathani - Lam Chi
 Local No. 421/422 Nakhon Ratchasima - Ubon Ratchathani - Lam Chi
 Local No. 423/424 Lam Chi - Samrong Thap - Nakhon Ratchasima
 Local No. 425/426 Lam Chi - Ubon Ratchathani - Nakhon Ratchasima
 Local No. 427/428 Nakhon Ratchasima - Ubon Ratchathani - Nakhon Ratchasima

References 
 
 
 

Railway stations in Thailand
Railway stations opened in 1926